Cirrhinus molitorella (mud carp or dace) is a species of ray-finned fish in the genus Cirrhinus found mainly in southern China and Vietnam.

History
The mud carp is a native Asian freshwater fish with a broad distribution from the Mekong River to the Pearl River deltas, inhabiting lakes, rivers and reservoirs. 

Mud carp cultivation was introduced to China during the Tang dynasty (618–907 AD) as a substitute for common carp, as the common carp was forbidden to fish due to a ban. Chinese aquaculture farmers adapted by raising mud carp, which were bottom feeders, in polyculture with top-feeding grass carp, while silver carp or bighead carp lived and fed in the middle depths.

Habitat
Mud carp is typically a subtropical fish. The mud carp is found in the mud and Mekong River and Pearl River delta, as well as bodies of freshwater along these two rivers. In China's Guangdong province and Guangxi autonomous region, mud carp makes up about 30% of the freshwater fish population.

The fish has been introduced to Indonesia, Singapore, Japan, Taiwan, and Hong Kong.

Within China the fish is raised on fish farms.

Dispersion 
The mud carp is native to Southern China and parts of Mainland Southeast Asia. It is present in major river systems such as the Pearl River, Red River (China/Vietnam), Mekong River, and Chao Phraya River.

Diet
Mud carp is an omnivore and mainly consumes water plants or insects. Farm raised carp are fed pellets.

Culinary Use

Due to low cost of production, the fish is mainly consumed by the poor and locally consumed; it is mostly sold live and eaten fresh, but can be dried and salted. Increased fishing has threatened the population of mud carp.

The fish is sometimes canned (typically as fried dace with salted black beans) or processed as fish cakes, fish balls  or dumplings. They can be found for retail sale within China and throughout the Chinese diaspora. Canned dace from China has periodically been found to carry traces of malachite green, a carcinogenic antimicrobial banned for use in food.

See also
 Dace
 Common carp

References

Bibliography

External links 
FAO Fisheries and Aquaculture Department Cirrhinus molitorella

Carp
molitorella
Freshwater fish of China
Fish of East Asia
Fish of Thailand
Taxa named by Achille Valenciennes
Fish described in 1844